Karadash may refer to:
Karadash, Turkmenistan
Sevkar, Armenia - formerly Karadash
Qaradaş, Azerbaijan
Qarah Dash (disambiguation)